Deelemania is a genus of African dwarf spiders that was first described by R. Jocqué & R. Bosmans in 1983.

Species
 it contains four species:
Deelemania gabonensis Jocqué, 1983 – Gabon
Deelemania malawiensis Jocqué & Russell-Smith, 1984 – Malawi
Deelemania manensis Jocqué & Bosmans, 1983 (type) – Ivory Coast
Deelemania nasuta Bosmans, 1988 – Cameroon

See also
 List of Linyphiidae species

References

Araneomorphae genera
Linyphiidae
Spiders of Africa